Barbara Hambly OBE (born 12 March 1958 in Chichester, West Sussex) is a former field hockey player from England, who captained the British squad at the 1988 Summer Olympics.  She was appointed OBE in the 1990 New Year Honours.

References

External links
 

1958 births
Living people
English female field hockey players
Field hockey players at the 1988 Summer Olympics
Olympic field hockey players of Great Britain
British female field hockey players
Officers of the Order of the British Empire
Sportspeople from Chichester